The Suwannee cooter (Pseudemys concinna suwanniensis) is a subspecies of turtle in the genus Pseudemys. It is a subspecies of the river cooter. The species is endemic to Florida, including in the Suwannee River.

Conservation status
P. c. suwanniensis was hunted for its meat, but is now protected.

Appearance
The carapace of P. c. suwanniensisis black in color, with yellow markings. The plastron is light orange or yellow with black markings. Adults can reach 17 inches (43.7 centimeters) in carapace length.

Diet
The diet of P. c. suwanniensis mainly consists of aquatic plants.

References

Further reading
Carr AF Jr. 1937. "A New Turtle from Florida, with Notes on Pseudemys floridana mobiliensis (Holbrook)". Occ. Pap. Mus. Zool. Univ. Michigan (348): 1–7. (Pseudemys floridana suwanniensis, new subspecies, pp. 4–6).

Pseudemys
Endemic fauna of Florida